The 2021 Iraq FA Cup Final was the 28th final of the Iraq FA Cup as a clubs-only competition. The match was contested between Al-Zawraa and Al-Quwa Al-Jawiya, at Al-Shaab Stadium in Baghdad. It was played on 19 July 2021 to be the final match of the competition. Al-Zawraa made their record 19th appearance in the Iraq FA Cup final while Al-Quwa Al-Jawiya made their eighth appearance.

Al-Quwa Al-Jawiya won 4–2 on penalties after a 0–0 draw for the club's fifth title, becoming the first team since the 2001–02 season to win the double of Iraqi Premier League and Iraq FA Cup.

Route to the Final

Note: In all results below, the score of the finalist is given first (H: home; A: away; N: neutral).

Match

Details

References

External links
 Iraq Football Association

Football competitions in Iraq
2020–21 in Iraqi football
Iraq FA Cup